Robert P. H. Chang is an American materials scientist who served as the president of the Materials Research Society (1989) and as a general secretary and president of the International Union of Materials Research Societies (IUMRS). Currently Chang heads the Materials Research Institute at Northwestern University. He is a member of advisory boards of the National Institute for Materials Science and of the journal Science and Technology of Advanced Materials.

Selected publications
According to the Google Scholar, Chang has co-authored over 500 articles with over 36,000 citations overall.  Here are the top cited ones:
High-performance bulk thermoelectrics with all-scale hierarchical architectures, K Biswas, J He, ID Blum, CI Wu, TP Hogan, DN Seidman, VP Dravid, Nature 489 (7416), 414-418

Anomalous band gap behavior in mixed Sn and Pb perovskites enables broadening of absorption spectrum in solar cells F Hao, CC Stoumpos, RPH Chang, MG Kanatzidis Journal of the American Chemical Society 136 (22), 8094-8099
Fabrication of ZnO nanorods and nanotubes in aqueous solutions ..., Y Li, H Zhang, TJ Marks, RPH Chang - Chemistry of ..., 2005 - ACS Publications
A nanotube-based field-emission flat panel display ..., JY Dai, EW Seelig, RPH Chang - Applied Physics ..., 1998 - aip.scitation.org

References

American materials scientists
Princeton University alumni
Princeton University faculty
Northwestern University faculty
Living people
Year of birth missing (living people)